Shabdamanidarpanam (Kannada: ಶಬ್ದಮಣಿದರ್ಪಣಮ್), also spelled Śabdamaṇidarpaṇam, is a comprehensive and authoritative work on Kannada grammar written by Kesiraja in 1260 CE. This work, which literally means "Jewel-mirror of Grammar", remains to-date a comprehensive and authoritative work on Kannada grammar. The rules here are set forth in kanda metre and is followed by a prose commentary in vrutti (illustrative commentary by the author himself) and is considered a writing of high value.  Though Kesiraja followed the model of Sanskrit grammar of the Katantra school and that of earlier writings on Kannada grammar, his work has an originality of its own.

Shabdamanidarpanam is the earliest extant work of its kind, and narrates scientifically the principles of old Kannada language and is a work of unique significance.

Mention of early poets
The text of Sabdamanidarpanam starts with an invocation of the great Kannada poets of earlier generations who are considered as authorities by Kesiraja, as cited by him.

Grammar topics

Significance of grammar
In the very beginning of the Shabdamanidarpanam, in the preface section, Kesiraja explains the significance of Grammar in the context of a language and its learning:

Adjectives
In one of the aphorisms (sūtra) of Shabdamanidarpanam, Kesiraja gives a list of forms ending in /-tu/ and /-du/ labelling them as guNavaachi (ಗುಣವಾಚಿ), the adjectives.

Lexicography
Shabdamanidarpanam is important from the view of lexicography. An attempt at lexicon-making is provided in several parts of the work. The work has the list of verbal roots and words containing ḷ and ḹ sounds. There is also a chapter called 'prayŌgasāra' where Kesiraja has quoted a number of rare words along with their meanings.

Sound forms
Articulate sounds

Inarticulate sounds

Notes

References 

Kannada grammar
Kannada literature
1260 books